The Scotland women's under-23 national football team, controlled by the Scottish Football Association, is Scotland women's national under 23 football team and is considered to be a feeder team for the Scotland women's national football team. As there is no competition organized by FIFA or UEFA for women at under-23 level, the team represents the country usually either in friendlies or invitational tournaments. Scotland does not regularly field a team at Under-23 level; the last squad that was selected was for a friendly with Panama in November 2022.

History 

The under-23 team was designed to bridge the gap in the step up from the under-19 team to the full national team. It would allow younger players a chance to remain in the national team set-up longer term and an opportunity to remain in the national team manager's plans and possibly provide the players with the most promise a pathway into the full national team eventually.

Tournaments

2008 Nordic Cup roster 

The U-23 women's squad that competed at the Nordic Cup tournament in Sweden from 14 to 22 July 2008. Sneddon was handed the captaincy for the tournament.

Results

References 

F
European women's national under-23 association football teams
Women's national under-23 association football teams